Claxton may refer to:

Places
Claxton, County Durham, England
Claxton, Norfolk, England
Claxton, North Yorkshire, England
Claxton, Georgia, USA
 the Claxton meteorite of 1984, which fell in Georgia, United States (see meteorite falls)
Claxton, Kentucky
Claxton, Anderson County, Tennessee
Claxton, McMinn County, Tennessee

Other uses
Claxton (surname)
Claxton Shield
Claxton Bakery
Claxton Castle
USS Claxton (DD-571)
USS Claxton (DD-140)